Miss Cambodia is a national beauty pageant in Cambodia which also selects other winners to participate in big beauty pageants like Miss Universe (separate pageant under Miss Cambodia), Miss International, and Miss Earth. The Miss Cambodia Organization also selects the other winners to participate in small pageants like Miss Asia Pacific International, and Miss Tourism International.

History
On 14 October 2016 the Kingdom of Cambodia saw five winners crowned at a grand and colorful festivities at the NagaWorld Hotel in Phnom Penh. The pageant was organized by Arise Agency Ltd. The pageant aims to be an annual national pageant aimed in sending representatives to international beauty pageants. That selects Cambodian representatives to compete in three of the four biggest International pageants such as Miss Universe, Miss International and Miss Earth.

The pageant also fields five queens to other minor international pageants such as Miss Tourism International, and Miss Asia Pacific International.

Events
The Miss Universe Cambodia holds a National Costume Competition. The grand final will be Live on CTN (Cambodia National TV Channel).

On March 31, 2019, the Miss Cambodia crowned at the Naba Theater, Nagaworld Hotel, Phnom Penh. The winners of Miss Cambodia are expected to represent Cambodia at the International competitions including Miss Universe, Miss International, Miss Earth, Miss Tourism International and Miss Asia Pacific.

Titleholders

Miss Cambodia

Winners by province

Miss Universe Cambodia

Winners by province

Miss World Cambodia

Winners by province

Miss Supranational Cambodia

Winners by province

Miss Grand Cambodia

Winners by province

International pageants

Miss Universe Cambodia 
The winner of Miss Universe Cambodia represents her country at the Miss Universe. On occasion, when the winner does not qualify (due to age) a runner-up is sent.

Miss World Cambodia

Miss International Cambodia

Miss Earth Cambodia

Miss Supranational Cambodia

Miss Grand International

Miss Intercontinental Cambodia

Miss Charm Cambodia

Miss Eco Cambodia

Miss Asia Pacific Cambodia

Miss Petite Globe Cambodia

See also

Miss Grand Cambodia
Cambodia at major beauty pageants

References

External links
 misscambodia.org
 ariseagency.com

Recurring events established in 2016
Cambodia
Cambodia
Cambodia
Cambodia
Cambodia
Cambodia
Beauty pageants in Cambodia
Cambodian awards